Great Barford is a village and civil parish in the Borough of Bedford, Bedfordshire, England, around  north-east of Bedford town centre. It is twinned with Wöllstein, Germany. The village is bypassed by the busy A421 road on the way between the M1 near Milton Keynes and the A1 near St Neots.

The village is known for its All Saints Church, with a 15th-century tower, and its similarly ancient bridge .  The  surroundings and historic buildings make it a favoured destination for canoeing, angling and picnics.  Nearby places include Renhold and Blunham.

History

Great Barford was mentioned in the Domesday Book as an important site, probably as a means of crossing the river that skirts the village. Although the area of the original ford was dug up in 1973, the bridge has existed since at least the 15th century.

The village itself is large and scattered but the majority of the houses are in the south-east of the parish. Throughout the village there are a large variety of houses some dating to the 17th century.

The village was once home to Great Barford Castle  , a Norman motte and bailey castle, which stood to the north of the village, but a priory has since been built on its location.

A very early reference to Barford may perhaps be found in a charter by which Offa, King of Mercia, in 792  confirmed various lands to the monastery of St. Albans. The charter purports to have been granted in the place which is called 'Æt beranforda.' The text of the charter is certainly spurious, but the witnesses and dating clause may well have been taken from a genuine instrument. Even so, however, the identification with the present Barford cannot be considered certain.

Education
As part of Bedford Borough, Great Barford no longer shares a three-tier schooling system and is now home to a primary school (Great Barford Primary Academy).

For secondary school education, students of Great Barford are in the catchment area of Sandy Secondary School in the nearby market town of Sandy.

References

External links

 Village homepage
 Statistics about Great Barford

Villages in Bedfordshire
Populated places on the River Great Ouse
Civil parishes in Bedfordshire
Borough of Bedford